The International Fincastle Competition is a contest of skills between the air forces of the United Kingdom, Australia, Canada and New Zealand. During the competition, crews compete in anti-submarine warfare, anti-surface warfare, and intelligence and surveillance gathering.

Origins
The Fincastle Competition began in 1960 when Mr. and Mrs. Aird-Whyte presented a silver tray, (now the Fincastle Trophy), in memory of their son Sergeant Nairn Fincastle Aird-Whyte, (who was killed in action in 1943 while flying with the RAF Coastal Command). Initially the competition was for accuracy in depth charge bombing showcase but it has evolved over the years to reflect the new duties of today's air forces. The competition fosters relations among the four participating nations while encouraging learning and skill sharing.

Results

ASW Bombing Competition
Crews flew over their own home waters and sent results to an Adjudicating Committee in London for the selection of the winner.

ASW Competition
Format as per previous competition (in home waters), but using a wider range of ASW skills to evaluate the winner.

ASW Competition
From 1971, the competition sorties were flown from a common venue, exercising ASW skills in a set format gradually evolved over the years, but kept to a broadly consistent focus.

MPA ISTAR Competition
Format was changed to focus on a broader range of Intelligence, Surveillance, Target Acquisition, and Reconnaissance (ISTAR) missions, as well as retaining an ASW component. Rather than a dedicated submarine, the competition is held in conjunction with a major exercise.

Fincastle Patches

Maintenance Trophy
In 1996 Lockheed Martin sponsored the first Fincastle Maintenance Trophy. According to the Canadian Air Force, competition for the Maintenance Trophy "evaluates each team’s skills with maintenance, support, and flight line operations."

Sources

 Canadian Air Forces article
2005 competition
2006 competition
Fincastle Committee

References

Military excellence competitions
Anti-submarine warfare